Huai Mun is a village and tambon (sub-district) of Nam Pat District, in Uttaradit Province, Thailand. In 2005 it had a population of 2,604 people. The tambon contains eight villages.

References

Tambon of Uttaradit province
Populated places in Uttaradit province